WOW Gospel Essentials is a "best of" Gospel music collection spanning more than ten years. The album includes twelve tracks on one CD. It reached 124 on the Billboard 200 chart in 2008, third place on the Top Gospel Albums chart and twenty-second place on the Top R&B/Hip-Hop Albums chart.

Track listing

References

WOW series albums
2008 compilation albums
Gospel compilation albums